Thamara Abeyratne (born 21 September 1978) is a Sri Lankan former cricketer. He played in 87 first-class and 65 List A matches between 2000/01 and 2011/12. He made his Twenty20 debut on 17 August 2004, for Moors Sports Club in the 2004 SLC Twenty20 Tournament. Following his playing career, he became the head coach at Thurstan College.

References

External links
 

1978 births
Living people
Sri Lankan cricketers
Burgher Recreation Club cricketers
Lankan Cricket Club cricketers
Moors Sports Club cricketers